Sumanasiri Mallawarachchi Don (7 April 1944–10 March 1998), popularly known as Milton Mallawarachchi, was a Sri Lankan singer and musician. One of the most respected singers in Sri Lankan music history, Mallawarachchi was a trending act in Sri Lanka for more than a decade, performing nearly a total of 850 songs with over 35 albums. He is also known to be a music composer for most of his songs, a film play-back singer for the silver screen, a talent tabla and sitar player.

Personal life
Mallawarachchi was born on 7 April 1944 in Kotte, Colombo, Sri Lanka as the only child in the family. His father was Upasena Mallawarachchi and mother was Agnes Wickramarachchi. He lost his father at an early age, where he was a courageous child who struggled to win the battle of life with his mother in the midst of many hardships during his school days. He completed his education at Ananda Sastralaya, Kotte. After completing his education, he got his first job as a bill clerk at the Welikada Co-operative and later worked as a cashier at the Nawaloka business.

On December 23, 1973, he married Swarnamala Malathi Panangala. The couple had four children: Ranil, Harshini, Nadija, and Tharaka. The song, "Etha Epita Dura Akase", written by Karunarathne Abeysekara for Mallawarachchi, is dedicated to his wife Swarna.

Eldest son, Ranil Mallawarachchi, continues his father's legacy by performing his songs in shows and concerts. Ranil is married to Nirasha, a fashion blogger. The couple has one son and one daughter. Ranil's son, Pawan Mallawarachchi also entered music to his grandfather's legacy. Pawan is the youngest pilot to train as a pilot in Sri Lanka and Australia. Milton's younger son Tharaka is also a singer who sang the songs: Satuṭin Samugena, Virasaka Sitaṭa Lanvelā and A Dine Patan.

He died on 10 March 1998, at the age of 53, and is buried in the Borella cemetery.

Singing career 
As an early singer in the music industry, he became more involved in Hindi singing and also excelled as a guitarist, dholak drummer and tabla player. He was a member of a short-lived musical band called the "Sakyans" and subsequently the "La Ceylonians" since 1965. Mallawarachchi's vocals on the latter group's Daha Duke Vidyahala and Mal Ravamal led to his discovery by producer Patrick Corea. Corea offered to record four songs with the Mallawarachchi: Oruwaka Pawena, Ran Kooduwak Oba Sadu, Sansare Sewanalle and Mangale Neth Mangale in 1969. These songs were released on the Exvee label as a double set of 78 rpm records in 1969 and gave Mallawarachchi his first popular hit with Oruwaka Pawena. It was the last 78 rpm record set issued for non-film songs in Sri Lanka. These songs created a unique style of singing for Mallawarachchi, and all the melodies he sang became a mesmerising love song that captivated thousands of fans.

As the song became popular among radio listeners, he had to undergo a voice audition with the help of radio personalities Premakeerthi de Alwis and Ariyadasa Peiris, and in 1970 he became a Grade A singer at Sri Lanka Broadcasting Corporation. After the first hit, music composer Patrick Denipitiya gave the songs such as Ivuru Thala, Maa Haa Eda and Maa Nisa Oba a modern touch. The song Sayura Theredhi  helped him to become a huge success in outdoor musicals. Mallawarachchi sang songs by Karunaratne Abeysekera, K. D. K. Dharmawardena, Premakirthi de Alwis, Clarence Wijewardena, Upali Danawalawithana, Dharmasiri Gamage, Upali Kannangara, Ajantha Ranasinghe, Shelton Weeraratne, Kularatne Ariyawansa, Ananda Padmasiri, Vernon Perera, Chitrananda Abeysekera, Bandara K. Wijethunga and Vijaya Ramanayake. In 1969, Milton had the opportunity to sing the theme song Ran Dedunu Ran Patin composed by Siri Kularatne for the film Matara Achchi directed by Sathischandra Edirisinghe under the guidance of musician Victor Rathnayake. In 1970, he sang few songs  for the film Ran Onchilla directed by Dharma Sri Caldera under the music of Premasiri Khemadasa. Mallawarachchi debuted as a playback singer in the 1971 film, Poojithayo which was screened before Ran Onchilla. In this film, his first playback song was Sakwala Rathwana.

His first duet was Bindu Bindu which was sung with R. Chitra. In 1974, musician Clarence Wijewardena composed the songs Gana Andure, Eda Rae, Mata Men Ohutada and Maga Thotadhii for an EP release on Gemstone. Wijewardena also wrote the popular songs Awasara Natha Mata, Sulange Pawe, Thaniwee Sitinai. In the same year, Mallawarachichi sang with Rukmani Devi on Clarence's song Prem Raja Dahane. After Rukmani's demise, he sang the song with Indrani Perera and Samitha Mudukonduwa. Until 1975, he recorded several radio songs composed by Victor Rathnayake such as Seethala Lana Pini, Paa Sinaha Ae, Obe Neth Epa and Sukha Wedana.

One of Mallawarachchi's most successful songs was Me Mai Gaha Yata produced by Melroy Dharmaratne in 1976. It was released on the Silverline label as an EP along with Ran Mudu and two songs - Andanne Epa and Ma Samanalayak - by Shiromie Fernando."  Mallawarachchi was fortunate to be able to perform the last vocals of the Gramophone era as well as the early vocals of the cassette era. In 1978, Mallawarachchi released the first music audio cassette in Sri Lankan Sinhala music history, "Sanden Eha", on the Tharanga label, under the guidance of Vijaya Ramanayake. Mallawarachchi never performed an overseas concert turning numerous invitations down because he was afraid to fly.

He was the main male playback singer in the movie Senakeliya which was a box office hit in 1974. Its songs included Reyak Upadda and duets with Indrani Perera on "Samanala Renak Se" and duets with Victor Ratnayake and CD Fonseka. The music director was Patrick Denipitiya. In 1984, he was honored with the best playback singer award at the Sarasaviya Awards for Kendan Yannam sang with Priya Suriyasena and Gratien Ananda a song from Sena Samarasinghe's film Aethin Aethata. He has contributed backing vocals to nearly 150 films. It is reported that Mallawarachchi made the largest number of background songs for Gamini Fonseka started with song Reyak Upadda in 1974 film Senakeliya. At that time Gamini–Milton–Sarath was able to captivate the fans with a wave of film songs: Muwa Madahāsē, Ananga Ran Hīyen, Vikasita Pætuman (1978 film Aśā Dæsin), Mee Amba Aththē, Kīna Dam Miṭak (1981 film Chanchala Rēkhā).

Meanwhile, he starred in only two films: Sena Samarasinghe's films Mal Kekulu (1980) and Yali Hamuwennai (1980). He also sang Sinhala songs for many Pakistani, Nepalese and Bangladeshi films such as Sadākal Rændēvā, Sinha Pæṭaw, Doankāraya, Ayya Nagō, Mis Lankā, Vana Ræjina, Sebaḷiyō, Sāgara Peraḷiya and Oṭṭuyi Bæruvaṭa. After his stint with Tharanga label, he later teamed up with Sing Lanka label, which introduced a number of popular songs until the 1990s. Some of them include: Andurin Piri, Hitavatānangē, Tæluvē Num̆baṭayi, Veedi Konē, Pæṇi Kurullanē, Sændævē Ranvalā, Palathuru Vikuṇana Malanuvanē, Yālē Ayālē Giyā and Punchi Sinā Kohēdo. Meanwhile, he sang the songs Ranil Puthe, Duwe Harshani, Pipunu Mal Dekaku and Tharaka Puthe for his four children.

Mallawarachchi was a popular live attraction; at a time when there was no TV in Sri Lanka, his appearances at variety shows sponsored by the Ceylon Tobacco Company drew huge crowds. Mallawarachchi appeared alongside the Super Golden Chimes at the Super Concert 101/102 organized by Clarence. The one last song he recorded is Aga Rejiniya on the album "Senehasa Biduwak". Mallawarachchi sang the song Sanda Sulange Pawee for one last time for the television serial Hima Kadalla. In 1997, he sang for two movies (before the voice record by director of movie) Mohothin Mohotha and Re Ru, both released after his demise 1998 and 1999 respectively.
in Mohothin Mohothata movie, Milton re-singing Pera Nasu E geethe from Raththaran malli movie

Filmography

References

External links
Milton Mallawarachchi's Popular Songs 

1944 births
1998 deaths
20th-century Sri Lankan male singers
Sinhalese singers
Alumni of Ananda Sastralaya, Kotte